Henrik Jakobsen is a Danish curler.

At the national level, he is a seven-time Danish men's champion curler (1991, 1993, 1994, 1995, 2001, 2004, 2005), a two-time Danish mixed champion curler (1987, 1988) and a four-time Danish junior champion curler (1980, 1981, 1982, 1983).

Teams

Men's

Mixed

References

External links

Living people
Danish male curlers
Danish curling champions
Year of birth missing (living people)
Place of birth missing (living people)